Zombie Tsunami, formerly known as Zombie Carnaval is a side scrolling endless runner game. It was developed by French studio Mobigame and released for Android and iOS on May 31, 2012, and Windows 10 Mobile in 2015. It was renamed to Zombie Tsunami on August 11, 2012, to avoid a trademark conflict with Taito's Zombie Carnival mobile game, In 2013, Mobigame started Showing Spoilers Such as Mecha Bonus And Riderz bonus in their Facebook.

Reception
The game has a Metacritic score of 85% based on 8 critic reviews.

References

2012 video games
Endless runner games
IOS games
IOS-only games
Video games developed in France
Video games about zombies